The 2014 Morehead State Eagles football team represented Morehead State University in the 2014 NCAA Division I FCS football season. They were led by second-year head coach Rob Tenyer and played their home games at Jayne Stadium. They were a member of the Pioneer Football League. They finished the season 4–8, 3–5 in PFL play to finish in a tie for seventh place.

Schedule

References

Morehead State
Morehead State Eagles football seasons
Morehead State Eagles football